The Western Rail Plan is a metropolitan rail infrastructure project being planned in Melbourne, Australia. The project was initially announced during the 2018 Victorian State Election by the State Government. It includes the electrification of two currently existing regional lines to Melton and Wyndham Vale, as well as Fast Rail to Geelong, and other network capacity upgrades.
The project will allow for much higher capacity on the Western Corridor. The electrification to Melton is part of Stage 3 of the PTV Network Development Plan. $100 million is being invested in detailed planning and design work, to deliver the full separation of regional and metro services on the Geelong and Ballarat lines.  Staging of the works part of the plan are being done alongside the business case for the Melbourne Airport Rail Link.

History
The Western Rail Plan was originally announced by the Andrews Labor government just over a month before the 2018 Victorian state election, as a part of many rail projects announced through that campaign. However, one aspect of the plan, High Speed Rail to Geelong, was proposed by the Victorian Liberals on 3 October 2018, around two weeks before the Andrews Government announced the Western Rail Plan.

Plans for electrification were originally put forward by [[Public Transport Victoria] in the 2012 Network Development Plan, which suggested that the line should be electrified to Melton within the next 15 years. Wyndham Vale electrification was at Stage 4, which meant the project would take place within 20 years, but it was eventually added into stage 3 in the revised plan.

There was a joint push for electrification conducted by councils along the Serviceton railway line to Melton in May 2018, around six months before the 2018 Victorian state election. This push involved 6 local councils along the Serviceton line, being Brimbank, Melton, Moorabool, Ballarat, Ararat and Pyrenees. They called for electrification, 12 peak hour (electric) trains from Melton and services every 20 minutes off peak by 2026, and for 10 car trains and trains every 10 minutes at all non peak times by 2030. A publication by the City of Brimbank warned that if these measures were not put in place, there would be chronic overcrowding.

Planning for electrification to Melton and Wyndham Vale started in mid-2021 and will be completed by mid-2023.

Project Description

Melton Electrification
Part of the line between Melton and Deer Park was duplicated, as part of the Regional Rail Revival Project, which provisioned for future services and electrification. Electrification of the Ballarat rail line to Melton would potentially triple its carrying capacity, and will allow up to 1500 people to travel on a single train. The Melton line will also be quadruplicated as part of the electrification in order to separate regional and metropolitan services. Two level crossings located in Deer Park will be removed to allow for a higher frequency for trains to run on the line. There are plans for a proposed train station at Mt.Atkinson, as well as a train station servicing the Paynes Road Precinct.

Wyndham Vale Electrification
The line to Wyndham Vale connecting to Geelong was originally built as part of the Regional Rail Link Project, with the two new stations Wyndham Vale and Tarneit opening on 21 June 2015. Since the opening of these two stations there has been patronage growth of 131%.  There are provisions for several proposed stations at Truganina, Sayers Road, Davis Road and Black Forest Road. Like the Melton electrification, there will be quadruplication of the line, in order to separate regional and metropolitan services. A link between Wyndham Vale and Werribee is also being considered as part of the project, with the potential for that link to become part of the Suburban Rail Loop.

Geelong Fast Rail
The proposal for high-speed rail to Geelong came not too soon after the completion of the Regional Rail Link Project, in which the line to Geelong via Wyndham Vale and Tarneit was originally created. The high speed rail would enable a 32 minute journey between Geelong and Melbourne. Daniel Bowen, spokesman for the Public Transport Users Association, said the high-speed train project would boost regional development, and relieve overcrowding and delays on citybound trains from the west. The Andrews state government gave $50 million to develop the business case. The federal government has also promised to provide $2 billion, provided the Andrews government matched that investment.

In November 2020, the state government agreed to match the funding and both governments announced the stage 1 of the Geelong Fast Rail. The works will include:
 track upgrades between Werribee and Laverton, including a new dedicated express track for Geelong services
 upgrades to bridges over main roads
 station upgrades at Werribee and Laverton
 running Geelong services on the Werribee corridor is expected to free up room for more trains on the Sunshine corridor

Construction of the first stage Geelong Fast Rail is expected to begin in 2023. It is planned and will be constructed in conjunction with the Geelong Line upgrade as part of Regional Rail Revival program.

Analysis and Criticism
The primary aim of the project is to deal with the significant demand on the growing western corridor, which for the last decade has been growing exponentially, particularly upon completion of the Regional Rail Link, which provided a route into the City for growing outer Western suburbs such as Tarneit and Wyndham Vale, having previously had little to no public transport options at all. It aims to solve this issue by electrifying the lines to Melton and Wyndham Vale in order to take pressure off crowded regional trains, as well as high speed rail to Geelong in order to cut down travel times between the growing Geelong and the CBD. The project has been welcomed by local councils along the lines affected by this project, as well as major transport thinktanks such as the Rail Futures Institute  and the PTUA. However, the project has been criticised for its slowness, with some saying the projected 2032 completion date was too long. There has also been worries displayed by Geelong and Wyndham councils that they will be underserved if the new suburban services have to share tracks with trains as part of the Melbourne Airport rail link. Some are also concerned that the growing community of Bacchus Marsh will not be served by the electrification. Rail Futures Institute president John Hearsch said electrification beyond Melton would be necessary to meet the growing populations of Ballarat and Bacchus Marsh.

See also
Melbourne Airport Rail Link - Being done alongside Western Rail Plan
Council makes request for second Tarneit Railway Station

References

External links
Western Rail Plan

Proposed railway lines in Australia
Railway lines in Melbourne

Public transport in Melbourne